The 2018–19 Pittsburgh Panthers women's basketball team represented Pittsburgh University during the 2018–19 NCAA Division I women's basketball season. The Panthers, led by first year head coach Lane White, played their home games at the Petersen Events Center as members of the Atlantic Coast Conference. They finished the season 11–20, 2–14 in ACC play to finish in 14th place. They lost in the first round of the ACC women's tournament to Duke.

Previous season
They finished the season 10–20, 2–14 in ACC play to finish in a tie for thirteenth place. They lost in the first round of the ACC women's tournament to Wake Forest. On April 5, the previous head coach Suzie McConnell-Serio was fired. She finished at Pittsburgh with a 5-year record of 67–87.

Off-season

Recruiting Class

Source:

Roster

Schedule

Source:

|-
!colspan=9 style=|Exhibition

|-
!colspan=9 style=| Non-Conference Regular season

|-
!colspan=9 style=| ACC Regular season

|-
!colspan=9 style=| ACC Women's Tournament

References

Pittsburgh Panthers women's basketball seasons
Pittsburgh
Pittsburgh
Pittsburgh